
Lago di Tom is a lake in the Piora Valley, in the canton of Ticino, Switzerland.

See also
List of mountain lakes of Switzerland

Tom